The Goedehoop natural rock bridge  is a provincial heritage site in Ermelo in the Mpumalanga province of South Africa.

In 1982 it was described in the Government Gazette as

References
 South African Heritage Resource Agency database

Landforms of Mpumalanga
Natural arches
Rock formations of South Africa